The Greenbanks Hollow Covered Bridge is a historic covered bridge, carrying Greenbanks Hollow Road across Joes Brook in southern Danville, Vermont.  It is the only surviving 19th-century covered bridge in the town.  It was listed on the National Register of Historic Places in 1974.

Description and history
The Greenbanks Hollow Covered Bridge is located in a rural area of southern Danville, spanning Joes Brook, an east-flowing tributary of the Connecticut River. Greenbanks Hollow Road is a minor through road between Danville and Peacham. It is a single-span queen post truss structure, with flanking trusses of unequal length. It is covered by a metal gabled roof with broad eaves. The side walls are covered to about half their height with vertical board siding, which is extended around the full height of the portals. The bridge rests on abutments of stone and concrete; the northern one has been rebuilt after its original stone abutment collapsed.

The bridge's construction date and builder are not known.  Vermont historian Herbert Congdon claims that the bridge was originally uncovered, and that its roof is a later addition.  It is stylistically similar to the bridges located in nearby Lyndon, which also feature queen post trusses, half-height siding, and broad roofs.  It is the only surviving 19th-century covered bridge in the town of Danville.

See also
 
 
 
 
 List of covered bridges in Vermont
 National Register of Historic Places listings in Caledonia County, Vermont
 List of bridges on the National Register of Historic Places in Vermont
Claims that this bridge was originally uncovered are true. The photographer and antiquarian, Wallace Nutting, photographed the Greenbanks Hollow bridge in its uncovered state in a hand colored platinotype photograph entitled "Typical Bridge." This photograph does not have a Studio number in Nutting's catalog, which is uncommon, but not without precedent. Nutting's photograph of the Greenbanks Hollow bridge has "Copyright 1901 by W. Nutting" in the lower left hand corner of the photograph. So, as of 1901, the Greenbanks Hollow bridge was uncovered.

References

Covered bridges on the National Register of Historic Places in Vermont
National Register of Historic Places in Caledonia County, Vermont
Buildings and structures in Danville, Vermont
Queen post truss bridges in the United States
Covered bridges in Caledonia County, Vermont
Road bridges on the National Register of Historic Places in Vermont
Wooden bridges in Vermont